Rusland may refer to:

 the Dutch name for Russia;
 Rusland, Cumbria, a village in Cumbria, England;
 Rusland Hall, a country house in Rusland, Cumbria;
 Rusland Pool, a small river in Rusland, Cumbria;
 Gregory Rusland, Surinamese politician.